The Communauté d'agglomération de la Baie de Somme is a communauté d'agglomération in the Somme département and in the Hauts-de-France région of France. It was formed on 1 January 2017 by the merger of the former Communauté de communes de l’Abbevillois, the Communauté de communes de la Région d'Hallencourt and the Communauté de communes Baie de Somme Sud. Its area is 398.6 km2. Its population was 48,903 in 2018, of which 22,837 in Abbeville.

Composition 
This Communauté d'agglomération comprises 43 communes:

Abbeville
Arrest
Bailleul
Bellancourt
Bettencourt-Rivière
Boismont
Bray-lès-Mareuil
Brutelles
Cambron
Caours
Cayeux-sur-Mer
Citerne
Condé-Folie
Doudelainville
Drucat
Eaucourt-sur-Somme
Épagne-Épagnette
Érondelle
Estrébœuf
Fontaine-sur-Somme
Franleu
Frucourt
Grand-Laviers
Hallencourt
Huppy
Lanchères
Liercourt
Limeux
Longpré-les-Corps-Saints
Mareuil-Caubert
Mérélessart
Mons-Boubert
Neufmoulin
Pendé
Saigneville
Saint-Blimont
Saint-Valery-sur-Somme
Sorel-en-Vimeu
Vauchelles-les-Quesnoy
Vaudricourt
Vaux-Marquenneville
Wiry-au-Mont
Yonval

References 

Baie de Somme
Baie de Somme
Abbeville